In mathematics, the (real or complex) vector space of bounded sequences with the supremum norm, and , the vector space of essentially bounded measurable functions with the essential supremum norm, are two closely related Banach spaces. In fact the former is a special case of the latter. Pointwise multiplication gives them the structure of a Banach algebra, and in fact they are the standard examples of abelian Von Neumann algebras.

Sequence space

The vector space  is a sequence space whose elements are the bounded sequences. The vector space operations, addition and scalar multiplication, are applied coordinate by coordinate. With respect to the norm 

 is a standard example of a Banach space. In fact,  can be considered as  the  space with the largest . Moreover, every   defines a continuous functional on the space  of absolutely summable sequences by component-wise multiplication and summing:

By evaluating on  we see that every continuous linear functional on  arises in this way. i.e. 

Function space

 is a function space. Its elements are the essentially bounded measurable functions. Two such functions are identified if they are equal almost everywhere. Denote the resulting set by 

For a function  in this set, its essential supremum serves as an appropriate norm:

See  space for more details.

The sequence space is a special case of the function space:   where the natural numbers are equipped with the counting measure.

Applications

In simple economic models, it is common to assume that there is only a finite number of different commodities, e.g. houses, fruits, cars, etc., so every bundle can be represented by a finite vector, and the consumption set is a vector space with a finite dimension. But in reality, the number of different commodities may be infinite. For example, a "house" is not a single commodity type since the value of a house depends on its location. So the number of different commodities is the number of different locations, which may be considered infinite. In this case, the consumption set is naturally represented by

See also

References

Banach spaces
Function spaces
Normed spaces
Lp spaces